The Pilling–Bedworth ratio (P–B ratio), in corrosion of metals, is the ratio of the volume of the elementary cell of a metal oxide to the volume of the elementary cell of the corresponding metal (from which the oxide is created).

On the basis of the P–B ratio, it can be judged if the metal is likely to passivate in dry air by creation of a protective oxide layer.

Definition
The P–B ratio is defined as:
 

where:
  – Pilling–Bedworth ratio
  – atomic or molecular mass
  – number of atoms of metal per molecule of the oxide
  – density
  – molar volume

History
N.B. Pilling and R.E. Bedworth suggested in 1923 that metals can be classed into two categories: those that form protective oxides, and those that cannot. They ascribed the protectiveness of the oxide to the volume the oxide takes in comparison to the volume of the metal used to produce this oxide in a corrosion process in dry air. The oxide layer would be unprotective if the ratio is less than unity because the film that forms on the metal surface is porous and/or cracked. Conversely, the metals with the ratio higher than 1 tend to be protective because they form an effective barrier that prevents the gas from further oxidizing the metal.

Application 

On the basis of measurements, the following connection can be shown:
 RPB < 1: the oxide coating layer is too thin, likely broken and provides no protective effect (for example magnesium) 
 RPB > 2: the oxide coating chips off and provides no protective effect (example iron) 
 1 < RPB < 2: the oxide coating is passivating and provides a protecting effect  against further surface oxidation (examples aluminium, titanium, chromium-containing steels).

However, the exceptions to the above P-B ratio rules are numerous. Many of the exceptions can be attributed to the mechanism of the oxide growth: the underlying assumption in the P-B ratio is that oxygen needs to diffuse through the oxide layer to the metal surface; in reality, it is often the metal ion that diffuses to the air-oxide interface. 

The P-B ratio is important when modelling the oxidation of nuclear fuel cladding tubes, which are typically made of Zirconium alloys, as it defines how much of the cladding that is consumed and weakened due to oxidation. The P-B ratio of Zirconium alloys can vary between 1.48-1.56, meaning that the oxide is more voluminous than the consumed metal.

Values

References

Corrosion prevention